N-buna (nabuna, ナブナ, stylized as n-buna) is a Japanese music producer and composer. He is a Vocaloid music producer and is the guitarist and songwriter for the band Yorushika.

History 
N-buna was born in Gifu Prefecture in Japan. His family members all played music instruments, so he bought an electric guitar when he was in 8th grade. He started writing music, but did not publish his works until he came across vocaloid songs and realized that he can post his works on the internet.

In 2012, N-buna started composing as vocaloid music producer, and posted  on Niconico. After that, his 2013 song  reached first on the platform's daily vocaloid ranking.

On April 26, 2014, he released his first solo album, . Then, On July 22, 2015, he released  with U&R Records, marking his first album with a major record label. On July 6, 2016,  was released.

Together with vocaloid producer Orangestar, n-buna wrote the song Star Night Snow for SNOW MIKU 2017.

Though n-buna believes that vocaloid has its strengths as the singing is uniquely emotionless, he also wants to compose songs better expressed by a human. Vocalist suis has sung for n-buna's first live in 2016, and n-buna thinks suis's husky voice fits the types of music he wants to make.Thus, in April 2017, n-buna and suis formed the rock band Yorushika.

Most of n-buna's activities are henceforth under Yorushika. However, he still uses the name n-buna in various occasions. In 2019, he published a digital single Silence featuring vocalist Sarah Furukawa. NHK invited him to narrate a 2021 documentary on a transgender man living in Sendai, which came as a surprise for n-buna since he was mainly involved in music production. However, he accepted this request.

Discography 

N-buna has also released additional albums under the name of the rock duo Yorushika of which he is a member.

References 

Living people
Musicians from Gifu Prefecture
Year of birth missing (living people)
21st-century Japanese guitarists
Vocaloid musicians